The Ark of Bukhara is a massive fortress located in the city of Bukhara, Uzbekistan, that was initially built and occupied around the 5th century AD. In addition to being a military structure, the Ark encompassed what was essentially a town that, during much of the fortress's history, was inhabited by the various royal courts that held sway over the region surrounding Bukhara. The Ark was used as a fortress until it fell to Russia in 1920. Currently, the Ark is a tourist attraction and houses museums covering its history. The museums and other restored areas include an archaeological museum, the throne room, the reception and coronation court, a local history museum, and the court mosque.

Description

The Ark is a large earthen fortification located in the northwestern part of contemporary Bukhara. In layout, it resembles a modified rectangle, a little elongated from the west to the east.

The ceremonial entrance into the citadel is architecturally framed by two 18th-century towers. The upper parts of the towers are connected by a gallery, rooms, and terraces. A gradually rising ramp leads through a winch-raised portal and a covered long corridor to the mosque of Dzhuma. The covered corridor offers access to storerooms and prison cells. In the center of the Ark is located a large complex of buildings, one of the best-preserved being the mosque of Ul'dukhtaron, which is connected to legends of forty girls tortured and cast into a well.

Construction
Prince Siyawush or Siyavusha built the Ark of Bukhara and was eventually buried there. After his death, the great citadel was put out of commission to mourn the prince. Three thousand years later, Budun Bukhar Khudah restored the citadel. There were many aspects of the design of the Ark of Bukhara that were influenced by astrological elements. For example, the palace has 7 stone pillars for the 7 star constellation Ursa Major. The overall shape of the Ark was also influenced by the constellation. Foundations of the citadel were also influenced by the topography and tombs of the area. There are multiple different kinds of tombs that became a unique feature of Bukhara. Single tombs were located in city buildings and there were also special tombs reserved for important people.

The layout of the city divided it into three sections: the citadel, the madina, and the suburbs. All important buildings such as the mosques and government offices were within the citadel. The mosques within the Ark of Buhara were made of cotton, wood, clay, and both, raw and baked bricks. The baked bricks were used decoratively to line the mosques. The first mosque, Arslankhan, was built in 1119. Over its 349 year lifespan it was restored and expanded by the rulers, Kohandiz and Sharhristan. The rulers, amirs, and generals all lived inside the walls of the Ark of Bukhara. Outside of the ark were the suburbs where many villages were located. Eventually, the Canpirak wall was built to protect the people of those villages and provide more defense the citadel.

Legendary origin
In legend, the creator of the Ark was the epic hero Siyavusha. As a youth, he hid in the rich oasis country of Turana from his stepmother. Siyavusha and the daughter of the local ruler of Afrosiaba fell in love. The girl's father agreed to permit them to marry provided that Siyavusha would first build a palace in the area bounded by a bull skin, obviously intended as an impossible task. But Siyavusha cut the bull skin into slender strips, connected the ends, and inside this boundary built the palace. (This is essentially the classical legend of Dido and the founding of Carthage in North Africa, as recorded in antiquity.)

History
The Ark is built on the remains of earlier structures, which constitute a layer twenty meters deep under the base arch, the layers indicating that previous fortresses had been built and destroyed on the site.

The first known reference to the Ark is contained in the "History of Bukhara" by Narshakhi (899 - 960). Abubakra wrote "Bindu, the ruler of Bukhara, built this fortress, but it soon was destroyed. Many times it was constructed, many times destroyed." Abubakra says that when the last ruler to rebuild asked counsel of his wise men, they advised him to construct the fortress around seven points, located in the same relation to each other as the stars of the constellation Ursa Major. Thus built, the fortress was never again destroyed.

The age of the Ark has not been established accurately, but by 500 CE it was already the residence of local rulers. Here, in the fastness of the citadel, lived the emirs, their chief viziers, military leaders, and numerous servants. 

When the soldiers of Genghis Khan took Bukhara, the inhabitants of the city found refuge in the Ark, but the conquerors smashed the defenders and ransacked the fortress.

In the Middle Ages the fortress was worked on by Rudaki, Ferdowsi, Avicenna, Farabi, and later Omar Khayyám. Here also was kept a great library, of which Avicenna wrote: 

I found in this library such books, about which I had not known and which I had never before seen in my life. I read them, and I came to know each scientist and each science. Before me lay gates of inspiration into great depths of knowledge which I had not surmised to exist.

Most probably, the library was destroyed following one of the conquests of Bukhara.

During the Russian Civil War, the Ark was greatly damaged by Red Army troops under the command of Mikhail Frunze during the 1920 Battle of Bukhara. Frunze ordered the Ark bombed by aircraft, which left a large part of the structure in ruins. There is also reason to believe that the last Emir, Mohammed Alim Khan (1880–1944), who escaped to Afghanistan with the royal treasury, ordered the Ark to be blown up so that its sacred places (especially the harem) could not be desecrated by the Bolsheviks.

Gallery

Further reading
Bissell, Tom, Chasing the Sea: Lost Among the Ghosts of Empire in Central Asia. Vintage Departures, 2004.
Thubron, Colin, The Lost Heart of Asia. New York: HarperPerennial, 2001.

References

External links

Map of Bukhara (in Russian)  (Link was flagged as security threat)
Description of the Ark (in Russian)

Bukhara
Forts in Uzbekistan